A Moonport is a spaceport capable of sending vehicles to the Moon. It may refer to:
 Baikonur Cosmodrome, a rocket launch complex in Kazakhstan, used by Russia
 Kennedy Space Center, a launch operations site in Florida, used by NASA
 Kennedy Space Center Launch Complex 39, used for the Apollo and Space Shuttle programs
 Satish Dhawan Space Centre, a rocket launch centre in Andhra Pradesh, India
 Xichang Satellite Launch Center, a Chinese satellite launch facility